The Congress is a 2013 live-action/animated science-fiction drama film written and directed by Ari Folman, based on Stanisław Lem's 1971 Polish science-fiction novel The Futurological Congress. The film premiered at the 2013 Cannes Film Festival on 15 May 2013. Independent film distributor Drafthouse Films announced, along with Films We Like In Toronto, their co-acquisition of the North American rights to the film and a US theatrical and VOD/digital release planned for 2014.

Plot
Robin Wright is an aging actress with a reputation for being fickle and unreliable that prevents her from getting a lot of roles. Her son, Aaron, suffers from Usher syndrome, which is slowly destroying his sight and hearing. With the help of Dr. Barker, Robin barely manages to stave off the worst effects of her son's decline, although his condition is sliding into its terminal stage.

Robin's longtime agent Al takes her to meet Jeff Green, the CEO of Miramount Studios, a film studio that offers to buy her likeness and digitize her into a computer-animated version of herself. Realizing she may be unable to find future work with the emergence of this new technology, Robin agrees to do it for a hefty sum of money. She is also forced to promise never to act again. After her body is digitally scanned, the studio is able to make films starring her, using only computer-generated characters. Robin's virtual persona becomes the star of a popular film franchise, Rebel Robot Robin.

Twenty years later, Robin travels to Abrahama City, where she will speak at the "Futurological Congress", Miramount's entertainment conference. Abrahama City is an animated, surreal utopia that is created from figments of people's imaginations, where anyone can become an animated avatar of themselves, but are required to use hallucinogenic drugs to enter a mutable illusory state. While discussing her new contract with Jeff, Robin learns that the studio has developed a new technology that will allow anyone to devour her or possibly transform themselves into her. Robin agrees to the deal, but has a crisis of conscience, believing that no one should be turned into a product.

At the Congress, Robin publicly voices her contrary views, upsetting everyone there. Shortly afterwards, the Congress is interrupted by a group of rebels ideologically opposed to the technology industry. They assassinate the head of the Congress. During the attack, Robin is rescued by Dylan Truliner, who was Miramount's lead animator for her films. They escape, but she is soon captured by "Miramount Police" where Robin is later executed by Jeff as a punishment for rebelling against Miramount and the Congress. Still in this animated world, Robin is shown on a hospital bed, while doctors discuss her case. One doctor reveals that when Robin was found, she pleaded with her rescuers to execute her. The doctors decide that Robin has become so intoxicated by the hallucinogen that she must be frozen until a treatment for her condition can be found.

Twenty years further on, Robin is revived in the animated world. She reunites with Dylan, who tells her that technology has improved so that anything is possible. People can take on whatever form they wish and the ego no longer exists. Dylan and Robin fall in love and take a journey through a colorful imaginary world. However, Robin is still desperate to return to the real world and be with her son, Aaron. The only way to do that is using a suicide capsule that Dylan was given by Miramount, as his reward for twenty years of service. He gives it to Robin.
 
Re-entering the real world, Robin finds herself in a dystopian environment where the inhabitants are severely dysfunctional. Those who are still able to cope in the real world hover over ruined cities in large airships. Most people have left for an existence in the animated world. Aaron did it only six months earlier, when his condition left him virtually blind and deaf. Because Aaron likely created a new identity for himself in the animated world, there is no way for anyone to find him. While Robin can return to an animated existence, she cannot go back to the one she left behind, including Dylan, as that world was not real, but created by her consciousness.

On one of the ships, Dr. Barker gives Robin an inhalation ampoule that will allow her to return to the animated world. Taking it, Robin sees her son's entire life flash before her eyes. In the end, she discovers Aaron in the middle of an animated desert.

Cast
 Robin Wright as Robin Wright
 Paul Giamatti as Dr. Barker
 Jon Hamm as Dylan Truliner (voice)
 Danny Huston as Jeff Green
 Harvey Keitel as Al
 Kodi Smit-McPhee as Aaron Wright
 Sami Gayle as Sarah Wright
 Michael Stahl-David as Steve
 August Wittgenstein as Travis
 Jörg Vincent Malotki as Man in Zeppelin

Relation to The Futurological Congress by Stanisław Lem
While some elements of the film were added by Ari Folman, others were based on the science-fiction novel The Futurological Congress by Stanisław Lem. Similarly to Lem's Ijon Tichy, the actress is split between delusional and real mental states. In an early interview about the film, Folman said, "There is certainly nothing based on Lem in the first part of the movie. The second part is definitely different, but I used Lem's The Futurological Congress more as a source of inspiration, rather than the basis of the screenplay."

Later, at the official website of the film in an interview, Folman says that the idea to put Lem's work to film came to him during his film school. He describes how he reconsidered Lem's allegory of communist dictatorship into a more current setting, namely, the dictatorship in the entertainment industry, and expresses his belief that he preserved the spirit of the book despite going far away from it.

Production
The animation was created by Bridgit Folman Films Gang, based in Israel, supervising six animation studios worldwide ("studio 352" in Luxemburg, "walking the dog" in Belgium, "bitteschoen" in Berlin, "studio Rakete" in Hamburg, "Studio Orange" in Poland, and "Snipple" in the Philippines). As in Waltz with Bashir, Folman worked with David Polonsky as the artistic director and Yoni Goodman as the animation director. Principal live-action filming was done in the United States and Germany from February to March 2011. Folman began working on the film in 2008, securing additional financing in 2011 from French bank Coficine-Natixis. The film was completed and released in 2013.

Music
Max Richter, who had previously worked with Folman in Waltz with Bashir, created the soundtrack of The Congress.

Many of the songs are composed by Richter himself, but the soundtrack also includes the Andante movement from Franz Schubert's Piano Trio No. 2, Frédéric Chopin's Nocturne Op.27-1 in C# minor, "Forever Young" from Bob Dylan, and Leonard Cohen's "If It Be Your Will". These last two songs were covered by Robin Wright.

Milan Entertainment, Inc. launched the soundtrack (in digital format) on July 2, 2013.

Reception
The Congress received positive reviews. On Rotten Tomatoes, it has a 73% approval rating, based on reviews from 109 critics, with an average rating of 6.70/10. The website's critical consensus states: "The Congress rises on the strength of Robin Wright's powerful performance, with enough ambitious storytelling and technical thrills to overcome its somewhat messy structure." On Metacritic, the film has a 63/100 rating based on reviews from 31 critics, signifying "generally favorable reviews".

Keith Uhlich of The A.V. Club named The Congress the sixth-best film of 2014, tying it with the re-release of Level Five.

In 2013, The Congress won the Best Animated Feature Film Award at the 26th European Film Awards.

Scout Tafoya gave the movie 3½ stars in a 2014 review at RogerEbert.com, saying: "'The Congress' is a roll call of the orgiastic pleasures and bountiful comforts that art provides, and, a reminder of what waits for us when we leave the theater."

Awards
The movie won the 26th European Film Awards for the best animated feature film in 2013, as well as the Directors' Fortnight in the Cannes Film Festival. That same year, it won the Sitges Film Festival's Critics Award, too. In 2013, it was also nominated for Best Animation Film in the Gijon Film Festival.

References

External links
 
 
 
 
 The Congress, review on Culture.pl

2013 films
2013 animated films
2013 independent films
2010s science fiction drama films
2010s French animated films
Animated drama films
Belgian animated science fiction films
Belgian science fiction drama films
Belgian independent films
French animated science fiction films
French science fiction drama films
French independent films
German animated science fiction films
German science fiction drama films
German independent films
Israeli animated science fiction films
Israeli animated films
Israeli science fiction drama films
Israeli independent films
Luxembourgian animated science fiction films
Luxembourgian independent films
Polish animated science fiction films
Polish science fiction drama films
Polish independent films
2010s dystopian films
English-language French films
English-language German films
English-language Israeli films
English-language Luxembourgian films
English-language Polish films
European Film Awards winners (films)
Films scored by Max Richter
Films about actors
Films about filmmaking
Films based on Polish novels
Films based on science fiction novels
Films based on works by Stanisław Lem
Films shot in Germany
Films shot in the United States
Films with live action and animation
2013 drama films
France 2 Cinéma films
2010s English-language films
Films directed by Ari Folman
2010s German films